"Terentian" can refer to anything pertaining to the works of Terence.

Saint Terentian(us) (died 118) was Bishop of Todi who was killed during the reign of Hadrian (117–138).

Biography
His legend states that before he was killed, his tongue was cut out.  Then he was beheaded.  His feast day is September 1.

External links
 Terentian
Terentian
 San Terenziano

Notes and references

Bibliography
Acta Sanctorum: 
Lanzoni, Francesco (1927). Le diocesi d'Italia dalle origini al principio del secolo VII (an. 604). Faenza: F. Lega, pp. 425. 

Bishops in Umbria
118 deaths
2nd-century Italian bishops
2nd-century Christian martyrs
Year of birth unknown